The 1950 William & Mary Indians football team represented William & Mary during the 1950 college football season.

Schedule

NFL Draft selections

References

William and Mary
William
William & Mary Tribe football seasons